The Neftçi 2021–22 season was Neftchi Baku's 30th Azerbaijan Premier League season. Neftchi will compete in the Azerbaijan Premier League and in the Azerbaijan Cup and UEFA Champions League.

Season overview
On 25 May, Neftçi signed a new contract with Omar Buludov until 2024.

On 31 May, Neftçi signed a new contract with Fahmin Muradbayli until 2023.

On 2 June, Rahman Hajiyev signed a new contract with Neftçi until the summer of 2024.

On 7 June, Neftçi extended their contract with Mamadou Mbodj until the summer of 2023, with Mirabdulla Abbasov signing a similar contract the following day.

On 12 June, Neftçi announced the signing of César Meza from Keşla to a two-year contract.

On 16 June, Neftçi signed a new one-year contract, with the option of an additional year, with Vojislav Stanković.

On 20 June, Neftçi signed a Harramiz from Estoril.

On 27 June, Neftçi signed a Khayal Najafov from Sumgayit.

On 15 July, Neftçi signed a Romain Basque from Le Havre, with Hugo Basto signing from Estoril on 17 July.

On 14 August, Bursaspor announced the signing of Namik Alaskarov, whilst Neftçi contested the signing stating they still had a valid contract with Alaskarov.

On 1 September, Neftçi announced the signing of Ramon to a one-year contract, whilst also announcing that Mamadou Kané had been sold to Olympiacos before being loaned back to Neftçi until the end of the season.

On 8 September, Neftçi announced the signing of Tiago Bezerra to a one-year contract.

On 17 September, Neftçi announced the signing of Jorge Correa to a two-year contract.

On 29 December, Neftçi announced that Romain Basque had left the club by mutual consent, that they'd signed Azer Salahlı from Keşla to a 2.5year contract and that Fahmin Muradbayli had joined Keşla on loan for the remainder of the season.

On 5 January, Neftçi announced the signing of Eddy Israfilov to a 2.5-year contract.

On 10 January, Sabir Bougrine was sold to Tunisian club Espérance Sportive de Tunis.

On 21 January, Neftçi announced the signing of Guilherme Pato to a 2.5-year contract from Internacional and the departure of Harramiz.

The following day, 22 January, Neftçi announced the signing of Ivan Brkić to a 1.5-year contract from Riga and the departure of Jorge Correa by mutual consent.

On 27 January, Neftçi announced the signing of Azer Aliyev to a 3.5-year contract from Ufa.

Squad

Out on loan

Transfers

In

Loans in

Out

Loans out

Released

Friendlies

Competitions

Overview

Premier League

League table

Results summary

Results by round

Results

Azerbaijan Cup

UEFA Champions League

Qualifying rounds

UEFA Europa League

Qualifying rounds

UEFA Europa Conference League

Qualifying rounds

Squad statistics

Appearances and goals

|-
|colspan="16"|Players away on loan:

|-
|colspan="16"|Players who left Neftçi during the season:

|}

Goal scorers

Clean sheets

Disciplinary record

References

External links 
 Official Website 

Neftçi PFK seasons
Azerbaijani football clubs 2021–22 season
Neftchi